The 414th Expeditionary Reconnaissance Squadron is a provisional United States Air Force unit.  It operates the MQ-1B Predator, last known assigned to the 39th Expeditionary Operations Group, Incirlik Air Base, Turkey.

During World War II, the 414th Bombardment Squadron was a B-17 Flying Fortress squadron, assigned to the 97th Bombardment Group, Fifteenth Air Force. It earned Two Distinguished Unit Citations.

History
Established in early 1942 as a B-17 Flying Fortress heavy bomb squadron; trained under Third Air Force in Florida.   Deployed to European Theater of Operations (ETO) in mid-June 1942, being assigned to VIII Bomber Command in England.  The squadron was one of the first B-17 heavy bomb squadrons in the ETO.   During the summer of 1942, engaged in long range strategic bombardment of enemy military, transport and industrial targets, primarily in France and the Low Countries with limited fighter escorts.

Reassigned to the Twelfth Air Force in England, being deployed to Algiers as part of the initial Operation Torch forces that arrived in North Africa.  Squadron aircraft carried Triangle-O on tail.  Engaged in bombardment of enemy targets in Algeria and Tunisia as part of the North African Campaign, and attacked enemy strong points around Tunis as part of the Tunisian Campaign.  Continued heavy bomb missions of enemy targets in Sicily and Southern Italy and in late 1943 was reassigned to new Fifteenth Air Force formed in Southern Italy.  From airfields around Foggia, conducted long-range strategic bombardment missions over Southern Europe and the Balkans of enemy targets until the German Capitulation in May 1945.   Demobilized squadron personnel and aircraft were sent to the United States for reclamation in the fall of 1945; being inactivated in Italy in October.

The squadron was converted to provisional status as the 414th Expeditionary Reconnaissance Squadron and assigned to United States Air Forces Europe (USAFE) in the summer of 2011.  USAFE activated it for the first time at Incirlik Air Base, Turkey in the fall.

Lineage

 Constituted as the 24th Reconnaissance Squadron (Heavy) on 28 January 1942
 Activated on 3 February 1942
 Re-designated 414th Bombardment Squadron (Heavy) on 22 April 1942
 Re-designated 414th Bombardment Squadron, Heavy ca. 6 March 1944
 Inactivated on 29 October 1945
 Converted to provisional status and re-designated 414th Expeditionary Reconnaissance Squadron on 19 July 2011
 Activated on 15 October 2011

Assignments
 97th Bombardment Group, 3 February 1942 – 29 October 1945
 United States Air Forces Europe to activate or inactivate as needed, 19 July 2011
 39th Expeditionary Operations Group, 15 October 2011 – Present

Stations

 MacDill Field, Florida, 3 February 1942
 Sarasota Army Air Field, Florida, 29 March 1942 – 16 May 1942
 Grafton Underwood, England, 11 June 1942 – 8 September 1942
 RAF Polebrook (AAF-110), England, 8 September 1942 – 10 November 1942
 Maison Blanche Airport, Algeria, c. 13 November 1942
 Tafaraoui Airfield, Algeria, c. 22 November 1942
 Biskra Airfield, Algeria, 26 December 1942

 Chateaudun-du-Rhumel Airfield, Algeria, 8 February 1943
 Pont du Fahs Airfield, Tunisia, 12 August 1943
 Depienne Airfield, Tunisia, 14 August 1943
 Cerignola Airfield, Italy, c. 14 December 1943
 Amendola Airfield, Italy, 17 January 1944
 Marcianise Airfield, Italy, c. October 1945 – 29 October 1945
 Incirlik Air Base, Turkey, 15 October 2011 – Present

Aircraft
 B-17 Flying Fortress, 1942–1945
 MQ-1 Predator, 2011 – present

See also

 Boeing B-17 Flying Fortress Units of the Mediterranean Theater of Operations

References

Notes

Bibliography

 
 

Reconnaissance squadrons of the United States Air Force
Air expeditionary squadrons of the United States Air Force